Sapiteri may refer to:
 Sapiteri people, an ethnic group of Peru
 Sapiteri language, a language of Peru